Iannotta is a surname. Notable people with the surname include: 

Angela Iannotta (born 1971), Australian football player and coach
Gianfranco Iannotta (born 1994), American athlete